The women's pole vault at the 2014 European Athletics Championships took place at the Letzigrund on 12 and 14 August.

Medalists

Records

Schedule

Results

Qualification

4.50 m (Q) or at least 12 best performers (q) advanced to the Final.

Final

References

Pole Vault W
Pole vault at the European Athletics Championships
2014 in women's athletics